Augustus Pope may refer to
Albert Augustus Pope (1843–1909), officer in the American Union Army
Gus Pope (1898–1953), American discus thrower